Where I Am may refer to:

Where I Am, an album by Tammy Cochran, or the title song, 2007
Where I Am (EP), by Anja Nissen, 2017
"Where I Am", the title song, representing Denmark in the Eurovision Song Contest 2017
"Where I Am", a song by the Funkoars, 2011
"Where I Am", a song by Jake Owen from American Love, 2016
"Where I Am", a song by Status Quo from On the Level, 1975

See also